The Cathedral of Our Lady Assumed into Heaven and St Nicholas (Irish language: Ard-Eaglais Mhaighdean na Deastógála agus Naomh Nioclás), commonly known as Galway Cathedral, is a Roman Catholic cathedral in Galway, Ireland, and one of the largest and most impressive buildings in the city.

Construction began in 1958 on the site of the old city prison. It was completed in 1965, lending it the designation of being "the last great stone cathedral to be built in Europe". It was dedicated, jointly, to Our Lady Assumed into Heaven and to St. Nicholas.

History
A parish chapel was built around 1750 on Middle Street at Lower Abbeygate Street. In 1821 the chapel was replaced with a limestone church built in the Gothic style, and dedicated to St. Patrick. When the Diocese of Galway was established in 1831, St. Patrick's became the pro-cathedral. After the cathedral opened in 1965, St. Patrick's was deconsecrated.

Opening of the Cathedral
The Galway Cathedral was opened on 15 August 1965. President Éamon de Valera lit the sanctuary candle and Cardinal Richard Cushing of Boston delivered a sermon 'Why Build a Cathedral?'. Bishop Michael Browne, Bishop of Galway, was accompanied on the altar by four Archbishops.

Architecture

The architect of the cathedral was John J. Robinson who had previously designed many churches in Dublin and around the country. The architecture of the cathedral draws on many influences. The dome and pillars reflect a Renaissance style. Other features, including the rose windows and mosaics, echo the broad tradition of Christian art. The cathedral dome, at a height of 44.2 metres (145 ft), is a prominent landmark on the city skyline.

During a controversial interview on Telefís Éireann's The Late Late Show in 1966, Trinity College Dublin student Brian Trevaskis referred to the building as a "ghastly monstrosity". More recently, it was described in an Irish Times article concerning "ugly" Irish buildings as a "squatting Frankenstein’s monster" and "a monument to the hubris of its soft-handed sponsors".

Liturgy
Mass is celebrated every day in the cathedral. There is a Saturday evening Vigil mass at 6pm, and Sunday masses at 9am (i nGaeilge), 10:30am, 12:30pm and 6pm. On weekdays and holy days, mass is celebrated at 11am and 6pm.

Music

Choir
The cathedral has been home to an adult choir since the building was dedicated, the role of which is to provide the music at all major ceremonies and services as well as at the regular Sunday 10.30 am Mass. The choir's repertoire covers music from the 16th to the 21st centuries, as well as Gregorian chant and Irish traditional music.

Organs

The cathedral  pipe organ was originally built by the Liverpool firm of Rushworth & Dreaper in 1966; it was renovated and greatly expanded by Irish organ-builder Trevor Crowe between 2006 and 2007. It has three manuals and 59 speaking stops, and is used regularly during services as well as in the annual series of summer concerts. The cathedral also has a smaller portable instrument, with one manual and four stops. It is used in smaller-scale liturgy in the cathedral's side chapels, as well as in a continuo role in concerts.

The Gallery Organ stoplist since 2007

Manual compass: 61 notes
Pedal compass: 32 notes
Key-action: electro-pneumatic
Stop-action: electric
16 general combinations, with 96 levels of memory
8 combinations to each division, with 16 levels of memory
Sequencer with 999 memory slots

The Choir Organ stoplist since 2006

Manual compass: 56 notes
Key- and stop-action: mechanical

Gallery

Burials
Michael Browne
Eamonn Casey
James McLoughlin
Thomas O'Dea
Thomas O'Doherty

References

External links

 Galway Cathedral website
 Galway Cathedral Recitals website

Roman Catholic churches in Galway (city)
Churches in County Galway
Roman Catholic cathedrals in the Republic of Ireland
Roman Catholic Diocese of Galway, Kilmacduagh and Kilfenora
Roman Catholic churches completed in 1965
Tourist attractions in Galway (city)
20th-century Roman Catholic church buildings in Ireland
20th-century churches in the Republic of Ireland